The 47th edition of the World Allround Speed Skating Championships for Women took place on 8 and 9 February 1986 in The Hague at the De Uithof ice rink.

Title holder was Andrea Schöne-Mitscherlich from East Germany.

Distance medalists

Classification

 * = Fall
 DQ = Disqualified

Source:

References

Attribution
In Dutch

1980s in speed skating
1980s in women's speed skating
1986 World Allround
1986 in women's speed skating